This is a list of notable alumni of the University of North Alabama or its predecessors such as LaGrange College, Florence Wesleyan University and Florence State University:

Academia
Donald B. Dodd, Emeritus professor of history at Auburn University Montgomery and a noted authority on Southern Unionism in northwest Alabama, particularly the Republic of Winston.
Thomas Chase Hagood, Senior Associate Vice President for Academic Affairs and Dean of Undergraduate Studies, University of Utah, expert on student success in higher education, and historian of the American South and early Alabama.
David F. Kern, associate professor and McAdams Frierson Chair of Bank Management at Arkansas State University.
Thomas L. Maddin (1826-1908), Confederate physician, professor of medicine at the Vanderbilt University School of Medicine
Danny B. Moore, professor, provost and vice president of Academic Affairs, Chowan University. 
David Weir, professor emeritus at Cooper Union, expert on Decadent Movement in literature and its impact on America.

Arts and entertainment

Business

Jim Blasingame, founder of Small Business Network, author, syndicated radio show host
Wendell Wilkie Gunn, first black student admitted to Florence State Teachers College.

Law, government and politics

Military

James E. Moore, Major General, Alabama Army National Guard

Religion
Robert Hitchcock Spain, Bishop, United Methodist Church
Kip Box, Administrative Bishop, Michigan, Church of God (Cleveland, Tennessee).

Athletics

References

Lists of people by university or college in Alabama